Gianni Marchand (born 1 June 1990) is a Belgian cyclist, who currently rides for UCI Continental team .

Major results
2016
 2nd Circuit de Wallonie
2018
 1st  Overall Flèche du Sud
 1st Paris–Mantes-en-Yvelines
 5th Duo Normand
 6th Overall Tour of Belgium
 6th De Kustpijl
 9th Tour de Vendée
 10th Overall Tour de Taiwan
2019
 3rd Arno Wallaard Memorial
 7th Classic Loire Atlantique
 8th Overall Flèche du Sud
2021
 3rd Overall Tour of Belgium
2022
 1st Stage 1 Tour of Azerbaijan (Iran)
 2nd Overall Belgrade Banjaluka
 5th Overall International Tour of Hellas
 6th Overall Tour du Rwanda
 8th Brussels Cycling Classic

References

External links

1990 births
Living people
Belgian male cyclists
Cyclists from West Flanders
21st-century Belgian people